The Law and Technology Institute or LTI, formerly Institute for Communications Law Studies, is one of the institutes for specialized study within the Columbus School of Law at The Catholic University of America, in Washington, D.C. The Law and Technology Institutespecifically focuses on the areas telecommunications, technology, data privacy, cybersecurity, intellectual property and media law and policy.

History 
The Law and Technology Institute was established as the Institute for Communications Law Studies in 1981 by Catholic University of America Law Professor Harvey Zuckman.

Director
The current directors of the Law and Technology Institute are Professors Elizabeth Winston and Megan M. La Belle.

Campus 
The Law and Technology Institute is located within the Columbus School of Law.

Curriculum 

In addition to their normal legal coursework, Juris Doctor candidates in the Law and Technology Institute receive a certificate in their field of study after completing a curriculum in communications law and related subjects along with three externships in the communications, privacy or intellectual property fields of law.

Co-curricular activities 
There are several communications law related co-curricular activities at the Columbus School of Law including the Journal of Law and Technology, formerly called CommLaw Conspectus: Journal of Communications Law and Policy, a team that competes in the National Communications Moot Court Competition, and the CUA Communications Law Students Association.

Symposia 
The Law and Technology Institute co-sponsors regular communications law symposium.

Notable alumni 
Brendan Carr, Commissioner of the Federal Communications Commission
David Redl, Assistant Secretary for Communications and Information at the United States Department of Commerce

External links

References

Columbus School of Law
Educational institutions established in 1981
1981 establishments in Washington, D.C.